The deputy secretary of education oversees and manages the development of policies in the United States Department of Education. The deputy secretary focuses primarily on K–12 education policy, such as No Child Left Behind, the High School Initiative, and the Individuals with Disabilities Education Act. The deputy secretary also has responsibility for carrying out the intergovernmental relations of the department. The deputy secretary becomes acting secretary of education in the event of the secretary's absence, disability, or a vacancy in the Office of Secretary.

The office of the deputy secretary coordinates the work of the Office of Elementary and Secondary Education, the Office of Innovation and Improvement, the Office of English Language Acquisition, the Office of Special Education and Rehabilitative Services, and the Office of Safe and Drug-Free Schools. The deputy secretary also oversees the department's LEP Partnership, the Office for Small and Disadvantaged Business Utilization, and the department's partnership with The History Channel.

The deputy secretary is appointed by the president and confirmed by the United States Senate. The deputy secretary is paid at level II of the Executive Schedule, meaning as of 2006, he or she receives a basic annual salary of $162,000.

The current deputy secretary of education is Cindy Marten since May 18, 2021.

List of deputy secretaries of education

References

United States Department of Education officials
Education